Manfred II (1140–1215) was the second marquess of Saluzzo from his father's death in 1175 to his own. He was the son of Manfred I and Eleanor. He placed the capital of the margravate definitively in Saluzzo.

He married Azalaïs of Montferrat before 1182, forming an alliance with one of the most powerful dynasties in northern Italy.

Manfred expanded the march and fought against the expansionism of the neighbouring counts of Savoy. After several minor skirmishes, the two principalities came to terms in 1213 and peace was established for the final two years of his life. Since his eldest son Boniface had predeceased him in 1212, he was succeeded by his grandson, Manfred III, under the regency of Azalaïs. She had to pay tribute on behalf of young Manfred, and for the next century, Saluzzo was a vassal of Savoy.

Family
Manfred and Azalais had:
 Agnes, married Comita III of Torres
 Boniface (the heir, who predeceased his father), married Maria di Torres, daughter of aforementioned Comita. They were the parents of Manfred II's successor, Manfredo III of Saluzzo
 Margaret, married Geoffrey de Salvaing
 María, married Marquis William II of Ceva
 Thomas.

He also fathered an illegitimate son, Bastardino.

References

Sources

1140 births
1215 deaths
Manfred 2